Valdemir dos Santos Pereira (born November 15, 1974 in Cruz das Almas, Bahia) is a Brazilian former professional boxer who competed from 2001 to 2006 and held the IBF featherweight title in 2006. As an amateur Pereira represented Brazil at the 2000 Olympics, reaching the round of 16 of the featherweight bracket.

Amateur career
As an amateur, Pereira fought as a Featherweight for the Brazilian Olympic Team at the 2000 Summer Olympics in Sydney:
Defeated James Swan (Australia)
Lost to Ramazan Palyani (Turkey)

Professional career
Known as "Sertão", Pereira turned pro in 2001 and won the vacant IBF Featherweight Title with a decision victory over Fahprakorb Rakkiatgym in January 2006. He lost the title in his first defense, via disqualification against Eric Aiken later that year, due to excessive low blows. A rematch was scheduled but never materialized. He is now living at Cruz das Almas, Bahia, Brazil.

Professional boxing record 

{|class="wikitable" style="text-align:center"
|-
!
!Result
!Record
!Opponent
!Type
!Round, time
!Date
!Location
!Notes
|-
|25
|Loss
|24–1
|style="text-align:left;"| Eric Aiken
|
|8 (12), 
|13 May 2006
|style="text-align:left;"| 
|style="text-align:left;"|
|-
|24
|Win
|24–0
|style="text-align:left;"| Yuri Romanovich
|UD
|10
|9 Apr 2006
|style="text-align:left;"| 
|
|-
|23
|Win
|23–0
|style="text-align:left;"| Fahprakorb Rakkiatgym
|UD
|12
|20 Jan 2006
|style="text-align:left;"| 
|style="text-align:left;"|
|-
|22
|Win
|22–0
|style="text-align:left;"| Victor Hugo Paz
|UD
|10
|23 Jul 2005
|style="text-align:left;"| 
|
|-
|21
|Win
|21–0
|style="text-align:left;"| Euclides Espitia
|TKO
|3 (8)
|28 May 2005
|style="text-align:left;"| 
|
|-
|20
|Win
|20–0
|style="text-align:left;"| Whyber Garcia
|UD
|12
|28 Jan 2005
|style="text-align:left;"| 
|style="text-align:left;"|
|-
|19
|Win
|19–0
|style="text-align:left;"| Pastor Humberto Maurin
|UD
|12
|11 Dec 2004
|style="text-align:left;"| 
|style="text-align:left;"|
|-
|18
|Win
|18–0
|style="text-align:left;"| Emmanuel Lucero
|
|10
|13 Aug 2004
|style="text-align:left;"| 
|
|-
|17
|Win
|17–0
|style="text-align:left;"| Julio Cesar Alganaraz
|
|4 (8), 
|1 May 2004
|style="text-align:left;"| 
|
|-
|16
|Win
|16–0
|style="text-align:left;"| Rogers Mtagwa
|TKO
|8 (10), 
|3 Jan 2004
|style="text-align:left;"| 
|
|-
|15
|Win
|15–0
|style="text-align:left;"| Luis Enrique Adame
|UD
|10
|9 Aug 2003
|style="text-align:left;"| 
|
|-
|14
|Win
|14–0
|style="text-align:left;"| Oney Hellems
|TKO
|2 (10), 
|15 Mar 2003
|style="text-align:left;"| 
|
|-
|13
|Win
|13–0
|style="text-align:left;"| Ronaldo Lima
|TKO
|2
|16 Feb 2003
|style="text-align:left;"| 
|
|- 
|12
|Win
|12–0
|style="text-align:left;"| Marcos Badillo
|
|6
|13 Dec 2002
|style="text-align:left;"| 
|
|-
|11
|Win
|11–0
|style="text-align:left;"| Jose Claudio Da Silva
|KO
|4 (6)
|24 Aug 2002
|style="text-align:left;"| 
|
|- 
|10
|Win
|10–0
|style="text-align:left;"| Robert Enriquez
|TKO
|4 (6), 
|3 Aug 2002
|style="text-align:left;"| 
|
|-
|9
|Win
|9–0
|style="text-align:left;"| Cirilo Coronel Campos
|TKO
|2 (6)
|18 May 2002
|style="text-align:left;"| 
|
|-
|8
|Win
|8–0
|style="text-align:left;"| Sergio Gustavo Rodriguez
|KO
|2 (8)
|23 Mar 2002
|style="text-align:left;"| 
|
|-
|7
|Win
|7–0
|style="text-align:left;"| Almir Fernandes de Oliveira
|KO
|1 (10)
|26 Feb 2002
|style="text-align:left;"| 
|
|-
|6
|Win
|6–0
|style="text-align:left;"| Gutemberg Ferreira
|
|6
|21 Dec 2001
|style="text-align:left;"| 
|
|-
|5
|Win
|5–0
|style="text-align:left;"| Sebastiao Macaris
|TKO
|2 (4)
|17 Nov 2001
|style="text-align:left;"| 
|
|-
|4
|Win
|4–0
|style="text-align:left;"| Julio Cesar Soares
|KO
|2
|21 Sep 2001
|style="text-align:left;"| 
|
|-
|3
|Win
|3–0
|style="text-align:left;"| Renato Pedro
|KO
|2 (4)
|27 Jul 2001
|style="text-align:left;"| 
|
|-
|2
|Win
|2–0
|style="text-align:left;"| Jose Acioly de Barros
|
|2 (4)
|23 Jun 2001
|style="text-align:left;"| 
|
|-
|1
|Win
|1–0
|style="text-align:left;"| Ronaldo Conceicao
|
|4 (4)
|6 Mar 2001
|style="text-align:left;"| 
|

References

External links
 

1974 births
Living people
Featherweight boxers
Boxers at the 2000 Summer Olympics
Olympic boxers of Brazil
Brazilian male boxers
Sportspeople from Bahia
20th-century Brazilian people
21st-century Brazilian people